Ilagala is an administrative ward in Uvinza District of Kigoma Region in Tanzania. 
In 2016 the Tanzania National Bureau of Statistics report there were 29,333 people in the ward, from 47,026 in 2012. Prior to 2014 the village of Mwakizega was in the Igalula Ward before splitting off to become the Mwakizega Ward.

Villages / neighborhoods 
The ward has 2 villages and 11 hamlets.

 Ilagala
 Kabuyange
 Katete
 Lugogoni
 Lugongoni
 Machazo
 Mahanga
 Msambara
 Kajeje
 Kajeje A
 Kajeje B
 Mkanga
 Tundegambazi

References

Wards of Kigoma Region